Cedar Creek Township is one of twenty townships in Allen County, Indiana, United States. As of the 2010 census, its population was 12,570.

Geography

Cities, towns, villages
 Grabill
 Leo-Cedarville

Unincorporated towns
 Cedar Shores at 
 Hursh at 
(This list is based on USGS data and may include former settlements.)

Adjacent townships
 Jackson Township, DeKalb County (north)
 Spencer Township, DeKalb County (northeast)
 Springfield Township (east)
 Milan Township (southeast)
 St. Joseph Township (southwest)
 Perry Township (west)
 Butler Township, DeKalb County (northwest)

Cemeteries
The township contains these three cemeteries: Saint Michaels, Schlatter and Yaggy.

Major highways

Rivers
 St. Joseph River

Lakes
 Cedarville Reservoir
 Viberg Lake

School districts
 East Allen County Schools

Political districts
 Indiana's 3rd congressional district
 State House District 85
 State Senate District 14

References

Citations

Sources
 United States Census Bureau 2008 TIGER/Line Shapefiles
 United States Board on Geographic Names (GNIS)
 IndianaMap

Townships in Allen County, Indiana
Fort Wayne, IN Metropolitan Statistical Area
Townships in Indiana